Dennis Borkowski (born 26 January 2002) is a German footballer who plays as a forward for 3. Liga club Dynamo Dresden, on loan from RB Leipzig.

Club career
On 23 June 2022, Borkowski joined Dynamo Dresden on a season-long loan.

References

External links
 
 
 
 

2002 births
Living people
German footballers
Association football forwards
Bundesliga players
2. Bundesliga players
RB Leipzig players
1. FC Nürnberg players
Dynamo Dresden players